The 2016–17 Columbia Lions men's basketball team represented Columbia University during the 2016–17 NCAA Division I men's basketball season. The Lions, led by first-year head coach Jim Engles, played their home games at Levien Gymnasium in New York City and were members of the Ivy League. They finished the season 11–16, 5–9 in Ivy League play to finish in fifth place. They failed to qualify for the inaugural Ivy League tournament.

Previous season
The Lions finished the 2015–16 season 25–10, 10–4 in Ivy League play to finish in third place. They were invited to the CollegeInsider.com Tournament where they defeated Norfolk State, Ball State, NJIT and UC Irvine to become CIT champions.

Offseason

Departures

2016 recruiting class

2017 recruiting class

Roster

Schedule and results

|-
!colspan=9 style=| Non-conference regular season

|-
!colspan=9 style=| Ivy League regular season

Source

See also
 2016–17 Columbia Lions women's basketball team

References

Columbia Lions men's basketball seasons
Columbia
Columbia
Columbia